The 1989 Oregon Ducks football team represented the University of Oregon during the 1989 NCAA Division I-A football season. They were led by head coach Rich Brooks, who was in his 13th season as head coach of the Ducks. They played their home games at Autzen Stadium in Eugene, Oregon and participated as members of the Pacific-10 Conference. They finished the season with a record of eight wins and four losses (8–4 overall, 5–3 in the Pac-10) and defeated Tulsa in the Independence Bowl.

Schedule

Personnel

Season summary

Oregon State

Largest crowd to attend football game in state history

References

Oregon
Oregon Ducks football seasons
Independence Bowl champion seasons
Oregon Ducks football